Pougny is a commune in the Ain department in eastern France.

It lies near the border with Switzerland and is the first French village to be crossed by the Rhône, and a hydro-electric station constructed in 1926 which it shares with the Swiss village of Chancy is named after it.

Population

Transportation
The commune has a railway station, on the Lyon–Geneva line.

See also
Communes of the Ain department

References

Communes of Ain
Ain communes articles needing translation from French Wikipedia